Pasir Panjang is a state constituency in Perak, Malaysia, that has been represented in the Perak State Legislative Assembly.

The state constituency was first contested in 1995 and is mandated to return a single Assemblyman to the Perak State Legislative Assembly under the first-past-the-post voting system.

Definition 
The Pasir Panjang constituency spans largest portion of southern part of Manjung district including township of Seri Manjung and industrial area of Lumut Port. It contains the polling districts of Kampong Telok, Kampong Baharu, Sungai Wangi, Ladang Sungai Wangi, Kampong Sitiawan, Samudera, Pundut, Bandar Baru Seri Manjung, Seri Manjung, Kampong Dato Sri Kamarudin, Pasir Panjang, Batu 8 Lekir, FELCRA Lekir, Lekir, Lekir Tengah, Sungai Tiram Lekir and Kayan.

Demographics

History

Polling districts
According to the federal gazette issued on 31 October 2022, the Pasir Panjang constituency is divided into 17 polling districts.

Representation History

Election results

See also 
 Perak State Legislative Assembly

References

Perak state constituencies